The 2007 Thurrock Council election took place on 3 May 2007 to elect members of Thurrock Council in Essex, England. One third of the council was up for election and the Conservative party lost overall control of the council to no overall control.

The Conservatives, Labour and British National Party (BNP) contested all 16 wards which were up for election. In total 55 candidates stood in the election including 6 Liberal Democrats, 3 from the United Kingdom Independence Party, 2 independents and 1 candidate from the Independent Working Class Association. Anti-social behaviour, recycling and cleanliness were seen as major issues by the parties, on a council which was seen as a top Labour target.

The British National Party put up candidates in every ward, for the first time. However, they secured no seats despite claiming that they were picking up votes from right wing Conservative supporters disaffected with David Cameron, particularly in middle class areas. In the West Thurrock and South Stifford ward, Ken Daly stood for the BNP in protest at the treatment of his son's killer.

The results of the election saw the Conservatives lose their overall majority on the council after losing 3 seats and only gaining one. The Labour party made a net gain of two seats, while the BNP came second in 6 seats after a strong rise in votes. Overall turnout was 31% and after the election the balance of power on the council was held by 3 independents.

After the election, the composition of the council was:
 Conservative 24
 Labour 22
 Independent 3

Election results

Ward results

References

2007
2007 English local elections
2000s in Essex